Pamahiin is a 2006 Filipino supernatural horror film directed by Rahyan Carlos, released on April 19, 2006. It stars Dennis Trillo, Paolo Contis, Marian Rivera, and Iya Villania. The premise of the film is based on personal beliefs in superstitions in the Philippines.

Plot

Cast
Dennis Trillo as Noah
Iya Villania as Eileen
Marian Rivera as Becca
Paolo Contis as Damian
Vangie Labalan as Tita Amelia
Chris Daluz as Mang Sebring
Kookoo Gonzales as Soledad
Jaclyn Jose as Aling Belinda
Arpee Bautista as Temyong
Erica Dehesa as Lota
JM Reyes as Young Noah

Production
Regal Films producers Lily Monteverde and daughter Roselle hired television director Rahyan Carlos to direct his first full-length feature film. While collaborating with scriptwriter Andrew Paredes, the plot took inspiration following the recent death of Carlos' uncle who was also a director before filming. Carlos watched all the Asian horror movies while researching various Philippine supertitions, to bring influence to his film.

References

External links

2006 horror films
2006 films
Philippine horror films
2000s Tagalog-language films
Regal Entertainment films